June Rose Timperley (née White) was an English badminton player.

Badminton career
Born June White she came to prominence in the early fifties when playing doubles. Partnering Iris Rogers née Cooley the pair broke the stranglehold of the Danish pairs during the era of Danish domination by claiming three All England women's doubles titles. She also claimed three All England mixed doubles titles with David Choong and then Tony Jordan.

Personal life
She married John Timperley in 1955, a former badminton international. She died in 2017.

Medal Record at the All England Badminton Championships

References

English female badminton players
1933 births
2017 deaths